The  was a Japanese  cargo ship owned by Nippon Yusen Kaisha.  The ship was built in 1941 by Hakodate Dock at Hakodate on the northern island of Hokkaidō.

History 
The Yoshida Maru was built at Hakodate; and she left port in August 1941 on her maiden voyage.

The 2,921-ton vessel had a length of 310 feet (93 m), and her beam was 45 feet (13.8 m).

World War II
Yoshida Maru was requisitioned as an auxiliary gunboat/minelayer of the Imperial Japanese Navy. She was armed with 3 guns of 12 cm and machineguns.
On 1 October, 1943 reregistered as an auxiliary transport.
On 18 January 1944, she was sunk by the submarine USS Flasher at 140 miles west-southwest of Minami-Tori-shima,   with the loss of 76 passengers, eight crewmen and 15 gunners.

See also
 List of Japanese hell ships
 Foreign commerce and shipping of Empire of Japan

Notes

References
 Blair, Clay. (2001).  Silent Victory: The U.S. Submarine War Against Japan. Annapolis, Maryland: Naval Institute Press. ; 
 Ponsonby-Fane, Richard Arthur Brabazon. (1935).  The Nomenclature of the N.Y.K. Fleet. Tokyo : Nippon Yusen Kaisha.  OCLC 27933596
 Tate, E. Mowbray. (1986).  Transpacific steam: the story of steam navigation from the Pacific Coast of North America to the Far East and the Antipodes, 1867-1941. New York: Cornwall Books. ;

1941 ships
Ships of the NYK Line
Steamships of Japan
World War II merchant ships of Japan
Auxiliary ships of the Imperial Japanese Navy
Ships sunk by American submarines
World War II shipwrecks in the Pacific Ocean
Maritime incidents in January 1944
Japanese hell ships